"Liquid Lunch" is a song by Caro Emerald. The song was released as a digital download on 21 May 2013 as the second single from the album The Shocking Miss Emerald (2013). The song peaked at number 70 on the UK single chart, largely due to featuring in BBC Radio 2's Playlist 'A' List. The song was written by David Schreurs, Vincent DeGiorgio, Jan Van Wieringen, Robin Veldman, Wieger Hoogendorp.

Music video

Lyrics video
A lyrics video to accompany the release of "Liquid Lunch" was first released onto YouTube on 27 May 2013 at a total length of four minutes and one second.

Track listing

Chart performance

Weekly charts

Release history

References

2013 songs
Caro Emerald songs
2013 singles
Songs written by David Schreurs
Songs written by Vincent DeGiorgio